Nails is an American hardcore punk band from Oxnard, California. The group was formed in 2009 by frontman Todd Jones, formerly the guitarist of Terror, along with bassist John Gianelli and drummer Taylor Young of Disgrace. They released their debut EP Obscene Humanity in 2009, followed by the studio albums Unsilent Death (2010), Abandon All Life (2013) and You Will Never Be One of Us (2016), and a split EP with Full of Hell. Nails have achieved widespread notoriety and critical acclaim for their savage and intense sound.

History 
The band formed in 2009. They have since released three full-length albums and two EPs. As of June 2014, the band is signed to Nuclear Blast. They released their third album, You Will Never Be One of Us, on June 17, 2016.

On July 25, 2016, the band abruptly canceled a European tour, with promoters claiming the band were on a hiatus and "had no plans to play live or record again." This also led to canceling their appearance at Ozzfest Meets Knotfest. Todd Jones later stated that the band had never taken a hiatus. In December 2016, the band returned by playing at The Power of the Riff festival and releasing a split 7-inch with Full of Hell.

On November 30, 2020, following the announcement of the 10th anniversary reissue of Unsilent Death, Young announced that he quit the band in early Spring. The day later, John Gianelli also confirmed his departure from the band. From this point, Todd Jones is the only member of the band.

Musical style 
In a review of Abandon All Life, Pitchfork wrote that "Nails cram their brief but constantly shifting tracks with a chaotic, complex blend of hardcore punk, D-beat, grindcore, powerviolence, and death metal." In a 2013 interview for Invisible Oranges, Todd Jones named crust punk, death metal, and Japanese hardcore as the band's foremost musical influences. Rushonrock cited Nails, alongside Trap Them, as key players of the contemporary American crust scene.

Members 
Current
Todd Jones – vocals, guitar (2009–present)

Former
John Gianelli – bass (2009–2020)
Taylor Young – drums (2009–2020)
Tom Hogan – drums (2009)
Andrew Saba – guitar (2012–2015)
Leon del Muerte – guitar  (2017–2019)
Touring musicians
Jon Westbrook – bass (2009)
Phil Sgrosso – guitar (2016)

Timeline

Discography

Studio albums 
Unsilent Death (2010)
Abandon All Life (2013)
You Will Never Be One of Us (2016)

EPs 
Obscene Humanity 12-inch (2009)
Obscene Humanity 7-inch (2012)
Nails/Skin Like Iron Split 7-inch (2012)
Nails / Full of Hell Split 7-inch (2016)
I Don't Want to Know You 7-inch (2019)

References

External links 
Official website

American grindcore musical groups
Powerviolence groups
Death metal musical groups from California
American crust and d-beat groups
Hardcore punk groups from California
Musicians from Oxnard, California
Musical groups established in 2009
2009 establishments in California
Southern Lord Records artists
Musical groups from Ventura County, California